The 2002 Tour de Suisse was the 66th edition of the Tour de Suisse cycle race and was held from 18 June to 27 June 2002. The race started in Lucerne and finished in Biel. The race was won by Alex Zülle of the Coast team.

Teams
Seventeen teams of up to eight riders started the race:

Route

General classification

References

2002
Tour de Suisse